Giovanni Colombini (c. 1700–1774) was an Italian painter of the late-Baroque or Rococo period. He was born in Marca Trivigiana (March of Treviso), and painted in the style of Sebastiano Ricci. He painted frescoes in the Convent of the Dominicans in Treviso.

Giovanni Colombini (Founder of the Congregation of Jesuati) shares the same name.

Sources

18th-century Italian painters
Italian male painters
Italian Baroque painters
Painters from Venice
Year of birth uncertain
1774 deaths
Fresco painters
18th-century Italian male artists